Belgium–Israel relations are the bilateral relations between Belgium and Israel. 
Belgium voted in favor of the United Nations Partition Plan for Palestine in 1947 and recognized the State of Israel on January 15, 1950.  Belgium has an embassy in Tel Aviv, and Israel has an embassy in Brussels.

In February 2010, a plaque honoring King Albert I, husband of Elizabeth of Bavaria, was unveiled at Albert Square in Tel Aviv in the presence of the Tel Aviv mayor Ron Huldai and Ambassador Bénédicte Frankinet.

State visits

King Albert visited Tel Aviv in 1933 and was hosted by Meir Dizengoff.

King Baudouin and Queen Fabiola visited Israel in 1964.

History
In 1975, Belgium voted against the UN resolution equating Zionism with racism. It helped Israel establish informal ties with Tunisia and join the Western European and Others Group (WEOG) at the UN. Many cultural, scientific and economic bilateral agreements have been signed, and a number of Belgium-Israel friendship associations have been established. The faculty club and guesthouse of Hebrew University of Jerusalem, known as Beit Belgia, was built with the financial aid of the Belgian Friends of the Hebrew University.

In 2009, Israeli exports to Belgium reached $2.37 billion, while imports from Belgium totaled $ 2.56 billion. In 2010, trade increased by approximately 50%.

In March 2010, Israel and Belgium signed a new tax treaty agreement to improve the competitiveness of Israeli companies operating in Belgium and encourage Belgian investment in Israel.

See also
Foreign relations of Belgium
Foreign relations of Israel
Diamond industry in Israel
History of the Jews in Belgium

References

Further reading

External links
  Belgian embassy in Tel Aviv
  Israeli embassy in Brussels

 
Israel
Bilateral relations of Israel